Hornavan is a lake in northern Sweden. Due to the cold subarctic climate of the area, it always freezes over for several months of the year in spite of its depth.

Geography 
The town of Arjeplog is located on its south-western shore. Research on the ecosystems comparing the larger islands with smaller islets in Hornavan and Uddjaur are popular due to their unpolluted environment, and have yielded . In June 2005 an international study was published in Nature entitled Effects of species and functional group loss on island ecosystem properties.

On its southern end, the lake attaches with the lake Uddjaure.

With a largest depth of  it is also the deepest.

The lake has been cultivated for water power. Hornavan, like all lakes in Arjeplog Municipality, has drinkable water.

Fishing 
Hornavan has 5 native species of whitefish: Coregonus pallasii, Coregonus megalops, Coregonus maxillaris, Coregonus nelssonii and Coregonus widegreni (the latter known under the name Valaam), with a sixth, Coregonus maraena, introduced in the 1940s.   Trolling for trout in the lake is also popular.

Sources 
  Allmänt om Arjeplog Arjeplog Official Site

References 

Skellefte River basin
Lakes of Norrbotten County